Vitalia Diatchenko was the defending champion, but she chose not to participate.

Tímea Babos won the title, defeating Misaki Doi in the final 7–5, 6–3.

Seeds

Main draw

Finals

Top half

Bottom half

Qualifying

Seeds

Qualifiers

Draw

First qualifier

Second qualifier

Third qualifier

Fourth qualifier

References 
 Main draw
 Qualifying draw

OEC Taipei WTA Challenger - Singles
Taipei WTA Ladies Open